Fusillade Mountain is located in the Lewis Range, Glacier National Park in the U.S. state of Montana. Fusillade Mountain lies immediately north of Gunsight Lake at the western terminus of the St. Mary Valley and can be seen from the Going-to-the-Sun Road. The mountain was named by George Bird Grinnell in 1891, "as a satirical gesture at W. H. Seward and Henry L. Stimson for firing a futile volley at a group of goats on the side of this mountain".

Geology

Like the mountains in Glacier National Park, Fusillade is composed of sedimentary rock laid down during the Precambrian to Jurassic periods.

Climate

Based on the Köppen climate classification, it is located in an alpine subarctic climate zone characterized by long, usually very cold winters, and short, cool to mild summers. Temperatures can drop below −10 °F with wind chill factors below −30 °F.

See also
 Mountains and mountain ranges of Glacier National Park (U.S.)

References

External links
 National Park Service web site: Glacier National Park
 Fusillade Mountain weather: Mountain Forecast

Mountains of Glacier County, Montana
Mountains of Glacier National Park (U.S.)
Lewis Range
North American 2000 m summits